Phyllactinia angulata is a plant pathogen infecting pistachio and elm trees.

References

Fungal tree pathogens and diseases
Fruit tree diseases
Erysiphales